The following is an overview of 1923 in film, including significant events, a list of films released and notable births and deaths.

Top-grossing films (U.S.)
The top eight films released in 1923 by U.S. gross are as follows:

Events
April 4 – Warner Bros. Pictures Inc. incorporated in the United States.
April 15 – Lee De Forest demonstrates the Phonofilm sound-on-film system at the Rivoli Theater in New York with a series of short musical films featuring vaudeville performers.
Henry Roussel's Les Opprimés is released, introducing mattes (painted by W. Percy Day) to French cinema.
October 16 – Brothers Walt and Roy O. Disney establish the Disney Brothers Cartoon Studio (later to be known as Walt Disney Productions).

Notable films released in 1923
American films unless stated otherwise

A
Adam's Rib, directed by Cecil B. DeMille
The Ancient Law (Das alte Gesetz), directed by E. A. Dupont, starring Henny Porten – (Germany)
Ashes of Vengeance, directed by Frank Lloyd, starring Norma Talmadge and Wallace Beery
The Audacious Mr. Squire, directed by Edwin Greenwood, starring Jack Buchanan – (GB)

B
The Balloonatic, directed by Edward F. Cline and Buster Keaton, starring Buster Keaton
The Bells, directed by Edwin Greenwood, based on the 1867 play The Polish Jew by Erckmann-Chatrian – (GB)
The Bishop of the Ozarks (lost), directed by Finis Fox
Black Oxen, directed by Frank Lloyd, starring Corinne Griffith
The Blizzard (lost), directed by Mauritz Stiller – (Sweden)
Blood and Soul (Chi to Rei), directed by Kenji Mizoguchi – (Japan)
Bonnie Prince Charlie (lost), directed by Charles Calvert, starring Ivor Novello and Gladys Cooper – (GB)
The Brass Bottle (lost), directed by Maurice Tourneur

C
Cameo Kirby, directed by John Ford, starring John Gilbert
Circus Days, directed by Edward F. Cline, starring Jackie Coogan
Cœur fidèle (Faithful Heart), directed by Jean Epstein – (France)
The Covered Wagon, directed by James Cruze, starring J. Warren Kerrigan and Lois Wilson

D
The Daring Years (lost), directed by Kenneth Webb, starring Mildred Harris and Clara Bow
 The Doll Maker of Kiang-Ning (Der Puppenmacher von Kiang-Ning), directed by Robert Wiene, starring Werner Krauss – (Germany)
Drakula halála (Dracula's Death) (lost), directed by Károly Lajthay – (Hungary)
The Drums of Jeopardy, directed by Edward Dillon, starring Elaine Hammerstein and Wallace Beery, based on the 1920 novel by Harold MacGrath

E
The Extra Girl, directed by F. Richard Jones, starring Mabel Normand

F
Faust, directed by Bertram Phillips, based on the 1808 play by Johann Wolfgang von Goethe – (GB)
Frozen Hearts, directed by J. A. Howe, starring Stan Laurel

G
The Gold Diggers (lost), directed by Harry Beaumont	 
The Grub-Stake, directed by Bert Van Tuyle, starring Nell Shipman

H
The Harbour Lights, directed by Tom Terriss, starring Tom Moore and Isobel Elsom – (GB)
Hoy o Nuca, Bésame, directed by José Nepomuceno – (Philippines)
The Hunchback of Notre Dame, directed by Wallace Worsley, starring Lon Chaney, Patsy Ruth Miller and Norman Kerry, based on the 1831 novel by Victor Hugo

I
I Will Repay, directed by Henry Kolker, starring Holmes Herbert and Flora Le Breton – (GB)
I.N.R.I., directed by Robert Wiene – (Germany)
The Isle of Lost Ships (lost), directed by Maurice Tourneur
Itching Palms, directed by James W. Horne, based on the play When Jerry Comes Home by Roy Briant

L
The Lady Owner, directed by Walter West – (GB)
The Last Moment (lost), directed by J. Parker Read Jr., starring Henry Hull, Doris Kenyon and Louis Wolheim
Little Old New York, directed by Sidney Olcott, starring Marion Davies
The Lost Soul, directed by Hugo Werner-Kahle – (Austria)
The Love Nest, directed by Edward F. Cline and Buster Keaton, starring Buster Keaton
 The Loves of Mary, Queen of Scots, directed by Denison Clift, starring Fay Compton – (GB)

M
Main Street (lost), directed by Harry Beaumont
The Man in the Iron Mask (Der Mann mit der eisernen Maske), directed by Max Glass – (Germany)
The Merchant of Venice (Der Kaufmann von Venedig), directed by Peter Paul Felner, starring Werner Krauss and Henny Porten – (Germany)
Merry-Go-Round, directed by Erich von Stroheim, starring Mary Philbin and Norman Kerry
Miss Suwanna of Siam (Nang Sao Suwan) (lost), directed by Henry MacRae
The Monkey's Paw, directed by Manning Haynes, based on the 1902 short story by W. W. Jacobs – (GB)
Mysteries of a Barbershop (Mysterien eines Friseursalons), directed by Erich Engel – (Germany)
The Mystery of Dr. Fu Manchu, 15-part serial directed by A. E. Coleby – (GB)

O
Our Hospitality, directed by John G. Blystone and Buster Keaton, starring Buster Keaton
Out to Win, directed by Denison Clift, starring Catherine Calvert and Clive Brook – (GB)

P
Paddy the Next Best Thing (lost), directed by Graham Cutts, starring Mae Marsh – (GB)
The Pilgrim, a Charlie Chaplin film
Puritan Passions (lost), directed by Frank Tuttle, starring Glenn Hunter and Mary Astor, based on the 1908 play The Scarecrow by Percy MacKaye
The Purple Highway (lost), directed by Henry Kolker, starring Madge Kennedy

R
Raskolnikow, directed by Robert Wiene – (Germany)
The Red Inn (L'auberge rouge), directed by Jean Epstein, based on the 1831 short story by Honoré de Balzac (remade in 1951) – (France)
Red Lights, directed by Clarence G. Badger, starring Marie Prevost, based on the play The Rear Car by Edward Everett Rose
Le Retour à la Raison (Return to Reason), directed by Man Ray – (France)
Rosita, directed by Ernst Lubitsch, starring Mary Pickford
La Roue (The Wheel), directed by Abel Gance – (France)
Rupert of Hentzau (lost), directed by Victor Heerman

S
Safety Last!, directed by Fred C. Newmeyer and Sam Taylor, starring Harold Lloyd
Salomé, directed by Charles Bryant, starring Alla Nazimova
Scaramouche, directed by Rex Ingram, Starring Ramón Novarro, Alice Terry and Lewis Stone
Schatten – Eine nächtliche Halluzination (Shadows - a Nocturnal Hallucination), directed by Arthur Robison – (Germany)
The Shock, directed by Lambert Hillyer, starring Lon Chaney
The Shriek of Araby, directed by F. Richard Jones, starring Ben Turpin
The Sign of Four, directed by Maurice Elvey, starring Eille Norwood, based on the 1890 novel by Arthur Conan Doyle – (GB)
Slave of Desire, directed by George D. Baker, starring Bessie Love, based on the 1831 novel La Peau de chagrin by Honoré de Balzac
Souls for Sale, directed by Rupert Hughes, starring Eleanor Boardman, Mae Busch and Richard Dix
A Spectre Haunts Europe, directed by Vladimir Gardin, based on the 1842 short story The Masque of the Red Death by Edgar Allan Poe – (U.S.S.R.)
Squibs M.P., directed by George Pearson, starring Betty Balfour – (GB)
 The Street (Die Straße), directed by Karl Grune – (Germany)
Suzanna, directed by F. Richard Jones, starring Mabel Normand

T
The Ten Commandments, directed by Cecil B. DeMille, starring Theodore Roberts
This Freedom, directed by Denison Clift, starring Fay Compton and Clive Brook – (GB)
Three Ages, directed by Edward F. Cline and Buster Keaton, starring Buster Keaton and Wallace Beery
Three Wise Fools, directed by King Vidor
Through Fire and Water, directed by Thomas Bentley, starring Clive Brook and Flora Le Breton – (GB)
Tiger Rose, directed by Sidney Franklin (director), starring Lenore Ulric
The Treasure (Der Schatz), directed by G. W. Pabst – (Germany)
Trilby, directed by James Young, based on the 1894 novel by George du Maurier
Tut-Tut and his Terrible Tomb, directed by Bertram Phillips – (GB)

U
Under the Red Robe,  directed by Alan Crosland, starring Robert B. Mantell
The Unknown Tomorrow (Das unbekannte Morgen), directed by Alexander Korda, starring Werner Krauss – (Germany)

W
While Paris Sleeps (lost), directed by Maurice Tourneur, starring Lon Chaney and John Gilbert, based on a novelThe Glory of Love by Leslie Beresford
The White Shadow, directed by Graham Cutts, starring Betty Compson and Clive Brook – (GB)
The White Sister, directed by Henry King, starring Lillian Gish and Ronald Colman
Why Worry?, directed by Fred C. Newmeyer and Sam Taylor, starring Harold Lloyd and Jobyna Ralston
Wild Bill Hickok, directed by Clifford Smith, starring William S. Hart
Within the Law, directed by Frank Lloyd, starring Norma Talmadge
A Woman of Paris, written and directed by Charles Chaplin, starring Edna Purviance
Woman to Woman (lost), directed by Graham Cutts, starring Betty Compson and Clive Brook – (GB)

Short film series
Charlie Chaplin (1914–23)
Buster Keaton (1917–41)
Laurel and Hardy (1921–43)
Our Gang (1922–44)

Animated short film series
Felix the Cat (1919–36)
Koko the Clown (1919–34)
Aesop's Film Fables (1921–34)
Alice Comedies
 Alice's Wonderland
The Red Head Comedies (1923).

Births
January 1 – Valentina Cortese, Italian actress (died 2019)
January 3 - Bud Tingwell, Australian actor (died 2009)
January 7 – Pinkas Braun, Swiss actor, director (died 2008)
January 8 – Larry Storch, American actor (died 2022)
January 17 - Carol Raye, British-born Australian actress, comedian and singer (died 2022)
January 19 – Jean Stapleton, American actress (died 2013)
January 22 - Diana Douglas, American actress (died 2015)
January 23 – Silvano Campeggi, Italian poster designer (died 2018)
January 26 – Anne Jeffreys, American actress (died 2017)
January 29 – Paddy Chayefsky, American screenwriter (died 1981)
February 2 – Bonita Granville, American actress (died 1988)
February 12 – Franco Zeffirelli, Italian director (died 2019)
February 21 – Lola Flores, Spanish actress (died 1995)
February 28 – Charles Durning, American actor (died 2012)
March 10 – Dolores Fuller, American actress (died 2011)
March 12 - Vladek Sheybal, Polish character actor, singer and director (died 1992)
March 19 – Pamela Britton, American actress (died 1974)
March 24 - Murray Hamilton, American actor (died 1986)
April 2 – Gloria Henry, American actress (died 2021)
April 4
Gene Reynolds, American actor, producer (died 2020)
Peter Vaughan, English character actor (died 2016)
April 5 - Michael V. Gazzo, American actor (died 1995)
April 6 - Chang Feng, Chinese actor (died 2022)
April 12 – Ann Miller, American dancer, singer, actress (died 2004)
April 13 - Don Adams, American actor, comedian and director (died 2005)
April 17 – Lon McCallister, American actor (died 2005)
April 28 – Adele Mara, American actress (died 2010)
April 29 - Irvin Kershner, American director, actor and producer (died 2010)
May 4 – Eric Sykes, British actor and comedian (died 2012)
May 7 – Anne Baxter, actress (died 1985)
May 14 – Mrinal Sen, Bengali director (died 2018)
May 20 – Edith Fellows, American actress (died 2011)
May 26
James Arness, American actor (died 2011)
Roy Dotrice, British actor (died 2017)
May 30 - Jimmy Lydon, American actor and producer (died 2022)
June 8 – Peggy Maley, American actress (died 2007)
June 12 – Herta Elviste, Estonian actress (died 2015)
June 28 - Ray Boyle, American actor (died 2022)
July 6 – Cathy O'Donnell, American actress (died 1970)
July 8 - Val Bettin, American actor (died 2021)
July 14 – Dale Robertson, American actor (died 2013)
July 18 – Michael Medwin, English actor and producer (died 2020)
July 22 – Mukesh, Indian singer (died 1976)
July 25
Estelle Getty, American actress and comedian (died 2008)
Allan Lurie, American voice actor (died 2015)
August 3 – Jean Hagen, American actress (died 1977)
August 9 -  John Stephenson, American actor (died 2015)
August 10
Rhonda Fleming, American actress (died 2020)
Vernon Washington, American character actor (died 1988)
August 14 – Alice Ghostley, American actress (died 2007)
August 15 – Rose Marie, American actress, singer (died 2017)
August 24 - June Dayton, American actress (died 1994)
August 28 - Alexander Doré, British actor, director and screenwriter (died 2002)
August 29 – Richard Attenborough, English actor and director (died 2014)
August 31 - Ed Grady, American actor (died 2012)
September 7 – Peter Lawford, British-American actor (died 1984)
September 9 - Cliff Robertson, American actor (died 2011)
September 11 - Betsy Drake, American actress, writer (died 2015)
September 23 - Margaret Pellegrini, American actress (died 2013)
September 27
Tony Giorgio, American actor (died 2012)
Mary McCarty, American actress (died 1980)
September 28 - William Windom, American actor (died 2012)
October 4 – Charlton Heston, American actor (died 2008)
October 5 – Glynis Johns, British actress
October 10 - Patrick Jordan, British actor (died 2020)
October 16 – Linda Darnell, American actress (died 1965)
October 23 - Frank Sutton, American actor (died 1974)
November 12 - Richard Venture, American actor (died 2017)
November 13 – Linda Christian, Mexican-American actress (died 2011)
November 21 - Helen Horton, American actress (died 2007)
November 28 
Gloria Grahame, American actress (died 1981)
James Karen, American actor (died 2018)
December 10 – Harold Gould, American actor (died 2010)
December 11 – Betsy Blair, American actress (died 2009)
December 12 - Bob Barker, American retired television game show host
December 29 
Dina Merrill, American actress (died 2017)
Mike Nussbaum, American actor and director

Deaths
 January 18 – Wallace Reid, American actor (born 1892)
 March 3 – Dante Testa, Italian actor and director (born 1861)
 March 26 – Sarah Bernhardt, French actress (born 1844)
 May 21 – Charles Kent, veteran actor and director (born 1852)
 June 11 – Porter Strong, American silent film actor
 June 17 – Macey Harlam, screen actor (born 1873)
 July 12 – Harry Lonsdale, stage and screen actor (born 1865)
 July 30 – Charles Hawtrey, veteran British actor (born 1858)
 August 29 – Bernard Durning, American actor and director, (born 1893)
 September 26 – Jerome Patrick, Broadway stage and silent film leading man (born 1883)
 October 28 – Joe Roberts, American actor (born 1871)
 November 20 – Allen Holubar, America actor and director (born 1888)
 November 30 – Martha Mansfield, American actress (born 1899)
 December 28 – Frank Hayes, American actor and comedian (born 1871)

Film debuts
 Jean Arthur
 Mary Carlisle
 Ricardo Cortez
 Marlene Dietrich
 Douglas Fairbanks Jr.
 Charles Farrell
 William Haines
 Ken Maynard
 Donald Meek
 Thomas Mitchell
 Jack Oakie
 Fay Wray

References

 
Film by year